The Highways Act 1662 (14 Car. 2 c. 6) is an Act of the Parliament of England. The Act was repealed by the Statute Law Revision Act 1863 and is no longer in force.

References

External links

Acts of the Parliament of England
1662 in law
1662 in England